Didier Berthet (born June 11, 1962 in Boulogne-Billancourt, Hauts-de-Seine, France) is a French Roman Catholic prelate, bishop of Saint-Dié since June 2016. Raised as a Protestant, Berthet converted to the Catholic Church as a young adult after attending an event when Pope John Paul II was present in France in the 1980. He was ordained a priest of the Roman Catholic Diocese of Nanterre in 1992 and in 2016 was named bishop of Saint-Dié.

Biography

Conversion and Training
Didier Barthet was born from a Roman Catholic father and a Calvinist Protestant mother and was baptized in the Reformed Church of France, receiving a Calvinist education. As a teenager, he attended the Saint Jean Hulst Catholic College in Versailles (1975-1980). At the end of high school, wishing to become a pastor, he reflected on what the Church is and comes to the idea that the Catholic Church is apostolic, heir to the faith and succession of the apostles. In 1980, while Pope John Paul II was in France, he took part in a meeting with young people and discovered "the mystery of the Church around [the Pope], as a successor of Peter and his person being the guarantor of a Church that comes from the origins of a universal Church". While studying at the Institute of Political Studies in Paris (1980-1983), he finally converted to Catholicism in 1983.
He then entered the French seminary of Rome (1987-1993) and the Gregorian University of Rome (1987-1993), where he obtained a Bachelor's Degree in Theology (1991) and a Bachelor's degree in Canon Law (1993).

Major departments

Roman Catholic Diocese of Nanterre
Ordained priest on June 27, 1992 for the diocese of Nanterre, Father Berthet worked in the cities of Rueil-Malmaison, Antony, Nanterre and Issy-les-Moulineaux.

In Rueil-Malmaison (1993-1998), he was curate of the parish of Saint-Pierre and Saint-Paul, responsible for the chaplaincy of public education, and parish priest of St. Joseph of Buzenval.

In Antony (1998-2006), he was parish priest of Saint-Saturnin (1998-2005); in charge of the accompaniment of seminarians (2001-2003); Episcopal Vicar of the South Sector of Nanterre (2003-2006), Member of the Episcopal Council and parish priest of Sainte-Maxime (2005-2006).

Berthet became chancellor of the diocese of Nanterre, a member of the Episcopal Council and the animator team of the Seminary Saint-Sulpice in Issy-les-Moulineaux (2006-2007), before becoming its superior (2007-2016).

Bishop of Saint Die
Named bishop of Saint Die on 15 June 2016 by Pope Francis, his episcopal consecration takes place on September 4, 2016 by the Archbishop of Besancon Jean-Luc Bouilleret, assisted by the Bishop Emeritus of Saint Die Jean-Paul Mathieu (whom he succeeded) and the Bishop of Nanterre Michel Aupetit (his former supervisor).
It is also engaged in ecumenical dialogue with the Eastern Orthodox Churches.

See also
 Roman Catholic Diocese of Saint-Dié
List of Bishops in France

References

External links
 http://www.eglise.catholique.fr/personne/mgr-didier-berthet/
 http://www.catholic-hierarchy.org/bishop/bberthetd.html 

1962 births
21st-century Roman Catholic bishops in France
Bishops of Saint-Dié
Converts to Roman Catholicism from Calvinism
Living people
Pontifical Gregorian University alumni
Sciences Po alumni